"Der Mond ist aufgegangen" (German for "The moon has risen") is a German lullaby and evening song by Matthias Claudius, one of the most popular in German literature. Also known under the name Abendlied (German for "evening song") it was first released in Musen-Almanach in 1779, published by Johann Heinrich Voß. In 1783, Claudius published the poem with a modification to verse six in Asmus omnia sua secum portans oder Sämmtliche Werke des Wandsbecker Bothen IV. Theil.

The poem "" (German for "Now all forests rest") by Paul Gerhardt from 1647 was its model. The exact dating is unclear; some believe that it was written in 1778 in Hamburg-Wandsbek, others that it originated earlier in Darmstadt.

Melody and text 
The melody first associated with the poem was composed by Johann Abraham Peter Schulz and published in his 1790 collection Lieder im Volkston, bey dem Claviere zu singen  – this remains the most popular version (see notation below). Among many other settings, the text is also often found set to the melody of the above-mentioned 'Nun ruhen alle Wälder' (Innsbruck, ich muss dich lassen, by Heinrich Isaac).

See also 
Christian child's prayer § Lullabies
Tha Tha Thabungton

References

Sources

Further reading
 Michael Heymel: In der Nacht ist sein Lied bei mir. Seelsorge und Musik. Spenner, Waltrop 2004, .
 Reiner Marx: "'Abendlied' von Matthias Claudius". In: Karl Hotz (Hg.): Gedichte aus sieben Jahrhunderten. Interpretationen. C. C. Buchners Verlag, Bamberg 1993, pp. 29–34.
 Reiner Andreas Neuschäfer: "'Der Mond ist aufgegangen'. Ideen, Impulse und Informationen in religionspädagogischer Perspektive." In: AUFBrüche (PTI Drübeck), 12 (2005), vol. 1, pp. 17–21.

External links 

 : "Das berühmteste deutsche Gedicht. Eine Besichtigung." literaturkritik.de, No. 7, July 2013 (in German)
 German and English text, oxfordlieder.co.uk
 German and English text, lieder.net
 "Der Mond ist aufgegangen" in Liederprojekt by Carus-Verlag and SWR2, 26 November 2015.
 
 Chorsatz by Ulrich Kaiser, 26 November 2015.

Lullabies
German poems
Volkslied